Luke Zantua Woodland (born 21 July 1995) is a professional footballer who plays as a defender for Malaysia Super League club Terengganu. Born in the United Arab Emirates and a former England youth international, he represents the Philippines national team.

Woodland started his career with Bolton Wanderers. He represented England at under-16, under-17 and under-18 levels and has played for the Philippines national team since 2015.

Early and personal life
Woodland was born in Abu Dhabi in the United Arab Emirates to an English father and a Filipino mother. Both of his parents worked in the Persian Gulf country. The family moved to Liverpool in England when Woodland was two years old.

Club career

Bolton Wanderers
Woodland joined Bolton Wanderers in their youth system at the age of eight. He progressed through the ranks, earning Player of the Year on two occasions. Woodland was given a football scholarship aged 15 and a two-year professional contract at 17 years old in April 2013.

Oldham Athletic
Woodland joined League One club Oldham Athletic on 13 March 2015 on a one-month loan. He made his debut the following day, playing the whole match in a 3–1 home defeat against Barnsley. His fourth appearance for Oldham, at home to Rochdale on 24 March 2015, saw him earn the man of the match award. After extending his loan spell until the end of the 2014–15 season, the club was interested in signing permanently.

After his loan spell at Oldham came to an end, Woodland was released by Bolton, ending his 12-year association with the club. After leaving Bolton, Woodland went on trial at Major League Soccer team New York Red Bulls.

Chester and Bradford Park Avenue
Woodland signed for National League club Chester on 30 October 2015 on non-contract terms. Woodland made his debut on 21 November 2015, coming on as a 75th-minute substitute for John Rooney in the 75th minute of a 2–1 home loss against Woking. After making one appearance, Woodland was released by the club in December 2015.

On 25 March 2016, Woodland signed for National League North club Bradford Park Avenue. Woodland made his debut in a 3–0 away loss against Boston United on 9 April 2016 and went on to make seven appearances for the club.

Return to Oldham Athletic and York City
Woodland re-joined Oldham Athletic for the second time on 11 July 2016, signing a six-month contract until December. He made his debut on 20 August 2016 as an 87th-minute substitute in a 1–0 away win over Bury.

Woodland was permitted to play for the reserve team of National League club York City, playing in a 3–0 victory at home to Mansfield Town. His release from Oldham was announced on 25 November 2016, and on the same say he signed for York on a contract until January 2017. Woodland made his debut the following day, starting their 3–0 away defeat to Bromley. However, he was dropped after this match, although manager Gary Mills affirmed that Woodland was still in his plans, saying: "Some people judge players on their first game, but I know Luke's a good player". On 5 January 2017, he extended his contract until the end of 2016–17. Having made three appearances, Woodland left York by mutual consent on 7 February 2017.

Ceres–Negros
Woodland signed for Philippines Football League club Ceres–Negros in February 2017. He left the club after deciding to not renew his contract after the 2017 season.

Buriram and loan to Suphanburi
He moved to Thailand in June 2018 signing up for Buriram United. However he was loaned to Thai League 1 club Suphanburi. While with Suphanburi, Woodland was involved in an altercation between himself and a Thai player while in a training session which caused him to loss favor with the club's non-English speaker coach. Sustaining injuries after playing in the 2020 AFF Championship with the Philippine national team, Woodland returned to Buriram and took part in training to regain his form. He went on to play in the 2019 AFC Asian Cup but failed to earn a break in Buriram.

Kuala Lumpur
Woodland signed for Malaysia Super League club Kuala Lumpur on 18 February 2019. They dropped injured defender Achmad Jufriyanto in place of Woodland.

Ratchaburi
After his stint with Kuala Lumpur, Woodland returned to Thailand to play for Ratchaburi and played 16 league games for the club in the 2020-2021 season.

International career
Woodland was eligible to play for England and the Philippines owing to his heritage, and the UAE for being born there. Between 2010 and 2012, Woodland was selected for England at youth level, playing 11 matches for the under-16, under-17 and under-18 teams.

In March 2015, the Philippine Football Federation invited him to join the Philippines national team training camp. However, he did not attend due to club commitments. Two months later, he was named in the Philippines' 23-man squad for their 2018 FIFA World Cup qualifiers against Bahrain and Yemen on 11 and 16 June respectively. Woodland missed the match against Bahrain due to delays in gaining international clearance, but made his debut against Yemen on 16 June 2015.

Career statistics

Club

International

References

External links

1995 births
Living people
People from Abu Dhabi
Citizens of the United Kingdom through descent
Footballers from Liverpool
Citizens of the Philippines through descent
English footballers
England youth international footballers
Filipino footballers
Philippines international footballers
Association football midfielders
Bolton Wanderers F.C. players
Oldham Athletic A.F.C. players
Chester F.C. players
Bradford (Park Avenue) A.F.C. players
York City F.C. players
Ceres–Negros F.C. players
Luke Woodland
Kuala Lumpur City F.C. players
Luke Woodland
English Football League players
National League (English football) players
Luke Woodland
2019 AFC Asian Cup players
British Asian footballers
Filipino British sportspeople
English people of Filipino descent
Filipino people of English descent